Musoma Rural District is one of the 9 districts of Mara Region of Tanzania. Mara region has the following Districts councils: Musoma district council, Rorya district council, Tarime rural, Tarime town council, Butiama, Serengeti, Bunda rural council, Bunda town Council and Musomal Municipal council.  Its administrative centre is the town of Musoma. The district is bordered to the east by Butiama District, to the south by Bunda District and to the west and north by Lake Victoria.

According to the 2012 Tanzania National Census, the population of the Musoma Rural District was 178,356.

Transport
There are no paved roads connecting the district. Musoma town can be reached using unpaved regional road R188. Musoma Rural District is connected to Bunda Town by unpaved regional road R187.

Administrative subdivisions
As of 2012, Musoma Rural District was administratively divided into 14 wards.

Wards

Bugoji
Ifulifu
Musanja
 Bugwema
 Bukima
 Bukumi
 Bulinga
 Busambara
 Bwasi
 Kiriba

 Makojo
 Mugango
 Murangi
 Nyambono
 Nyamrandirira
 Suguti
 Tegeruka

References

Districts of Mara Region